Thomas John Houghton (24 December 1861 – 30 August 1933) was an English-born Australian politician.

He was born in Liverpool to George Houghton and Frances Fairclough. His family arrived in New South Wales in 1866. Houghton left school at fourteen to work as a printer's apprentice, and from the age of twenty worked as a printer for Hansard. He married Catherine Susanna Kitsch on 31 December 1884 at Grafton; they had three children. Houghton was involved in the labour movement through his membership in a typographical association. Involved in the founding of the Labor Party, he was elected to the New South Wales Legislative Assembly for Glebe in 1891, but refused to sign the pledge and contested the 1894 election unsuccessfully as an independent free trader. He was involved in the campaign for Federation, and remained involved in the Trades and Labour Council until 1923, when he became an employer. Houghton died at Artarmon in 1933.

References

 

1861 births
1933 deaths
Members of the New South Wales Legislative Assembly
Australian Labor Party members of the Parliament of New South Wales